Sinemydidae is an extinct family of turtles from Cretaceous to Paleocene deposits in Asia and North America. Their exact position is engimatic, they have alternatively been considered stem-group cryptodires, but also "crownward stem-turtles" alongside Macrobaenidae, Paracryptodira, Xinjiangchelyidae, Thalassochelydia and Sandownidae outside of crown Testudines.

Genera
Dracochelys  Lianmugin Formation, China, Early Cretaceous (Aptian-Albian)
Hongkongochelys Upper Shaximiao Formation, China, Middle-Late Jurassic
Jeholochelys Jiufotang Formation, China, Early Cretaceous (Aptian)
Liaochelys  Jiufotang Formation, China, Early Cretaceous (Aptian)
Manchurochelys Yixian Formation, China, Early Cretaceous (Aptian)
Ordosemys
O. leios Luohandong Formation, China, Early Cretaceous
O. liaoxiensis Chengzihe Formation, China, Early Cretaceous (Aptian)
O. brinkmania Lianmugin Formation, China, Early Cretaceous (Aptian-Albian)
O. perforata Khulsangol Formation, Mongolia, Early Cretaceous (Albian)
O. donghai Chengzihe Formation, China, Early Cretaceous (Aptian-Albian)
Sinemys
†Sinemys brevispinus Tong and Brinkman 2012 Laohongdong Formation, China, Early Cretaceous
†Sinemys chabuensis Ji and Chen 2018 Jingchuan Formation, China, Early Cretaceous (Barremian)
†Sinemys gamera Brinkman and Peng 1993 Luohandong Formation, China, Early Cretaceous (Valanginian-Hauterivian)
†Sinemys lens Wiman 1930 Mengyin Formation, China, Early Cretaceous (Berriasian-Valanginian)
Wuguia
†Wuguia efremovi Khozatsky 1996 Hutubei Formation, China, Hauterivian/Barremian Lianmuxin Formation, China, Early Cretaceous (Aptian-Albian)
†Wuguia hutubeiensis Matzke et al. 2004  Hutubei Formation, China, Hauterivian/Barremian 
Xiaochelys Lianmugin Formation, China, Early Cretaceous (Aptian-Albian)
Yumenemys Hui-Hui-P'u, China, Late Cretaceous

References

Cryptodira
Extinct turtles
Prehistoric reptile families